Yuri Nosenko: Double Agent is a 1986 American–British television drama produced by the BBC and directed by Mick Jackson.

Plot
This film tells the true-life story of Yuri Nosenko, a top Soviet KGB agent who defected to the West at the height of the Cold War in 1964.

Cast

 Tommy Lee Jones as Steve Daley
 Josef Sommer as James Angleton
 Ed Lauter as Jerry Tyler
 Oleg Rudnik as Yuri Nosenko
 Edwin Adams as John Collins
 Kevin Cooney as Don Fisher

References

External links
 Yuri Nosenko: Double Agent at the Internet Movie Database

1986 television films
1986 films
British television films
Cold War films
Films directed by Mick Jackson
BBC television docudramas
1980s British films